Cheikh Mohammad   is a village situated in Akkar Governorate, Lebanon. Situated 400 metres above sea level, in between two mountains, it overlooks the Akkar plains and sea. It is made up of approximately 450 houses, with 99% of the population being Christian, mostly Greek Orthodox, Melkite Catholics and Maronites.  This small village contains two schools, a primary and secondary as well as two churches, one dating back hundreds of years. And the very first hospital in Akkar, "Akkar Rahal Hospital".

History
In 1838, Eli Smith noted  the village,  whose inhabitants were Greek Orthodox, located in the 'Akkar region.

In 1856 it was named Sheikh ¨Muhammed on Kiepert's map of Palestine/Lebanon published that year.

Village life
The Village is divided into two sections, the upper and the lower. The upper is predominantly made up of the Bitar and Khoury families. The lower is predominantly made up of the El-Cheikh, Rahal, Mahfoud, Boustani, Taoum, Helwe, and Yaacoub families, with the Halloun family being the most prominent and wealthy, making their wealth in the Australian Construction Industry. Although many of the families members have travelled abroad to escape the civil war of 1975–1990, many have returned in recent years. Many of them have also expanded and moved to many countries including Australia, United States of America, Canada, France, Brazil, Venezuela and Argentina.  

Cheikh Mohammad is a five-minute walk away from Halba, the capital city of Akkar Governorate, providing quick access to all household needs.

References

Bibliography

External links
Cheikh Mohammad,  Localiban
   "Lebanese struggle with broken economy," by Don Duncan. San Francisco Chronicle, March 23, 2008]

Populated places in Akkar District
Christian communities in Lebanon